P. africana may refer to:
 Plukenetia africana, a shrub found in South Africa
 Parachanna africana
 Paralomis africana, a king crab species found off the coast of Namibia
 Phyllomacromia africana, a dragonfly species
 Portia africana
 Prosopis africana, a flowering plant species found in Africa
 Prunus africana
 Pseudagrostistachys africana, a plant species found in Cameroon, Equatorial Guinea and Ghana

See also 
 Africana (disambiguation)